Chanz may refer to:
Nadine Chanz

See also

Chazz (name)